Ole Scavenius Jensen (21 March 1921 – 30 May 1990) was a Danish rower. He competed at the 1952 Summer Olympics in Helsinki with the men's eight where they were eliminated in the semi-final repêchage.

References

1921 births
1990 deaths
Danish male rowers
Olympic rowers of Denmark
Rowers at the 1952 Summer Olympics
Rowers from Copenhagen
European Rowing Championships medalists